The Juris were a tribe of South American Indigenous people.

Juris may also refer to:
 Juris (name)
 Juris Doctor, a law degree
 Genitive singular case of Latin ius
 Juris magazine, the magazine of the Duquesne Law School